The Fort de Chillon is a twentieth-century fortification directly adjacent to the medieval Château de Chillon on the edge of Lake Geneva in Switzerland. The fort secures the road and rail lines that pass along the lakeshore running east from Lausanne to the mountainous interior of Switzerland. The position is an advanced work protecting the approaches to Fortress Saint-Maurice, part of the Swiss National Redoubt. Deactivated as a military post in 1995, it is privately owned and is being converted to a wine cellar.

Description
The Fort de Chillon lies directly adjacent to the Château de Chillon, a major tourist attraction. The site has been fortified since at least the 12th century. The Fort de Chillon is a mixed infantry-artillery fort, located almost entirely underground in the steep slope rising to Veytaux above the rail line. The location is spanned by the Viaduc de Chillon. Built at the opening of the Second World War (1941), it was armed with a mixture of 75mm guns and 90mm anti-tank guns. Initial work was completed in 1942. The fort was designated A390 in the Swiss fortification nomenclature. The ensemble included permanent and rapidly deployable anti-tank obstacles, designed to stall or trap an enemy while the fort's weapons fired on them.

The fort was initially armed with two 75mm anti-tank guns for direct fire, replaced with 90mm guns in 1962. Two other 75mm guns were retained until 1978. Two additional 90mm guns and five machine guns completed the offensive armament. Defensive arms included two machine guns each at the Rocher de Veytaux and Montagnette, with three at Champ-Babaud, along with two 81mm mortars. Infantry bunkers command the road and rail lines adjacent to the castle, linked to the main fort by underground galleries.

The Fort de Chillon was manned by units of Mountain Brigade 10. The garrison comprised 131 men. Nine detached bunkers were provided for infantry forces defending the surface of the installation.

This position was covered from the direction of Saint-Maurice by the Fort de Champillon, an artillery fort. The Chablais plain to the south was covered by additional fortifications. The Chablais and Chillon ensembles were not considered part of Fortress Saint-Maurice proper, but were important advance works to delay and weaken an attacker before they reached the Saint-Maurice stopping line, or fort d'arrêt. The entire region is fortified with anti-tank barriers, permanent minefields and other barriers, while tunnels, bridges and retaining walls are mined or prepared for demolition.

Present status

As a result of the reorganization of Swiss fortifications under the Army 95 program, the fort was deactivated and declared surplus. Chillon was considered for purchase by the Canton of Vaud in 1998 and was briefly opened for public tours, with the intention of making it into a museum. However, the transaction fell through. The town of Chillon waived its rights in 2004, followed by the neighboring town of Veytaux. In 2010 the property was purchased by investors who plan to make the site a wine storage facility and tasting facility.  Tours may be instituted in the future.

References

External links
 Fort de Chillon Official website of the Fort de Chillon 
 Article on the Fort de Chillon with diagrams 
 Association Fort de Litroz at Association Fort de Litroz 
 Visite humoristique du fort de Chillon at APSF 
 Fort de Chillon (facebook) Official Facebook page of the Fort de Chillon 

Fortifications of Switzerland built in the 20th century
Government buildings completed in 1942
Infrastructure completed in 1942
Forts in Switzerland
1942 establishments in Switzerland
20th-century architecture in Switzerland